Annelise Mathilde Hovmand (17 September 1924 – 28 December 2016) was a Danish film director, screenwriter and film producer. She directed 12 films between 1955 and 1991. Her 1957 film Ingen tid til kærtegn won the Bodil Award for Best Danish Film and was entered into the 7th Berlin International Film Festival.

Hovmand died on 28 December 2016 at the age of 92.

Filmography
 Hvorfor stjæler barnet? (1955)
 Ingen tid til kærtegn (1957)
 Krudt og klunker (1958)
 Frihedens pris (1960)
 Gøngehøvdingen (1961)
 Sekstet (1963)
 Norden i flammer (1965)
 Grænseland (1965) (TV)
 Nu stiger den (1966)
 De forsvundne breve (1967)
 Et døgn med Ilse (1971)
 Høfeber (1991)

References

External links

1924 births
2016 deaths
Danish women film directors
Danish women screenwriters
Danish women film producers
Danish women writers
Film directors from Copenhagen